Michelle Sawatzky-Koop (born July 14, 1970 in Steinbach, Manitoba) is a Canadian former volleyball player and radio broadcaster. She competed at the 1996 Summer Olympics in Atlanta, Georgia with the Women's National Team, where the team finished 9th.

As a university player for the Manitoba Bisons, she was a two-time CIS Championship MVP in 1990 and 1991, as well a two-time CIS player of the year for the 1990-91 and 1991-92 seasons. Sawatzky was a part of the Bison's women's volleyball team that won three CIS championships in 1990, 1991 and 1992. In 1995, she joined the Canadian national team, who won a bronze medal at the Pan American Games in Argentina. In July 1996 the team finished 9th at the Summer Olympics in Atlanta.

Since 1997, Sawatzky has been a radio broadcaster and Morning Show co-host on CHSM, CFAM, and CJRB radio in southern Manitoba.

Sawatzky graduated from the University of Manitoba School of Music in 1993 with a Bachelor of Music Piano Performance. She has also organized and participated in the annual Southeastern Manitoba Festival, which takes place in Steinbach.

In 2022, Sawatzky was elected into the Manitoba Sports Hall of Fame.

References

External links
Canadian Olympic Committee

1970 births
Living people
Canadian Mennonites
Canadian women's volleyball players
Olympic volleyball players of Canada
Sportspeople from Steinbach, Manitoba
Volleyball players at the 1996 Summer Olympics
University of Manitoba alumni

Pan American Games bronze medalists for Canada
Pan American Games medalists in volleyball
Volleyball players at the 1995 Pan American Games
Medalists at the 1995 Pan American Games